Eric Schumann is an American football coach . His most recent job was as defensive coordinator at University of Alabama at Birmingham (UAB) from 2007 to 2010.

He served the previous four years as defensive coordinator of Tulane, and has coached defense at SMU, New Mexico, and Troy State. He was a defensive back at Alabama from 1974 to 1977.

His son, Glenn Schumann is currently the defensive coordinator at Georgia.

References

External links
 Tulane profile

Year of birth missing (living people)
Living people
American football defensive backs
Alabama Crimson Tide football players
East Tennessee State Buccaneers football coaches
New Mexico Lobos football coaches
SMU Mustangs football coaches
Tulane Green Wave football coaches
Troy Trojans football coaches
UAB Blazers football coaches
Valdosta State Blazers football coaches
West Alabama Tigers football coaches
High school football coaches in Alabama
High school football coaches in Georgia (U.S. state)
People from Blue Island, Illinois
Coaches of American football from Illinois
Players of American football from Illinois